Mwana Bute Kasongo (born 5 March 1964) is a Congolese sprinter. He competed in the men's 400 metres at the 1988 Summer Olympics.

References

1964 births
Living people
Athletes (track and field) at the 1988 Summer Olympics
Democratic Republic of the Congo male sprinters
Olympic athletes of the Democratic Republic of the Congo
Place of birth missing (living people)